Ida Siekmann (23 August 1902 – 22 August 1961) was a German nurse who became the first known person to die at the Berlin Wall, only nine days after the beginning of its construction.

Biography

Ida Siekmann was born on 23 August 1902, in Gorken near Marienwerder, West Prussia in the German Empire (now Górki, Kwidzyn County, Poland). She had moved to Berlin where she worked as a nurse, and by August 1961 was already a widow, although it is not known when she was widowed. Siekmann lived at Bernauer Straße 48 in the district of Mitte, and had a sister, Martha L., who lived only a few blocks away on Lortzingstraße.

After World War II, Berlin was divided into four Allied sectors, and while the street and the sidewalk of the Bernauer Straße lay in the French sector of West Berlin, the frontage of the buildings on the southern side lay in the Soviet sector of East Berlin. Siekmann regularly crossed the border between the French and Soviet sectors just by leaving her house. Siekmann's sister at Lortzingstraße was located in the French sector of West Berlin.

Death
On 13 August 1961, East Germany began the construction of the Berlin Wall, and immediately after the border between East and West Berlin was closed numerous families and individuals from 50 Bernauer Straße padreaddresses fled to the West. On 18 August 1961, East German leader Walter Ulbricht ordered the border troops to brick up the entrances and windows on the ground floor of the buildings on the southern side of the street. Members of the Combat Groups of the Working Class and Volkspolizei controlled every person who tried to enter the houses, and the residents were subject to rigid controls, even in the hallways. Many residents of such tenements still fled to West Berlin, as residents of the upper floors were often rescued by jumping sheets held open by the West Berlin fire department.

On 21 August, the entrance and windows of Bernauer Straße 48 were being barred by the East German authorities. The following morning, the day before her 59th birthday, Siekmann threw a quilt and some possessions down onto the street in West Berlin before she jumped out of the window of her fourth-floor (by North American standards, third floor by German standards) apartment. Siekmann jumped before the firefighters were able to properly open the jumping sheet, and was severely injured when she fell on the pavement. Siekmann died while on her way to the Lazarus Hospital shortly after the fall, thus becoming the first known casualty at the Berlin Wall.

Burial
Siekmann was buried at the Seestraße cemetery on 29 August; in September a memorial was erected at Bernauer Straße 48. The memorial was often visited by foreign politicians, including Robert F. Kennedy and Archbishop Makarios, to honour the victims of the Berlin Wall.

The houses on the southern side of Bernauer Straße were torn down in 1963 and replaced by a concrete wall.

See also 
 List of deaths at the Berlin Wall
 Berlin Crisis of 1961

Literature
Hans-Hermann Hertle, Maria Nooke, The deaths at the Berlin Wall 1961–1989: a biographical handbook (ed. the Centre for Contemporary History Potsdam and the Berlin Wall Foundation). Links, Berlin 2009, pp. 36–38

References

External links

Ida Siekmann – First Berlin Wall victim
(English translation of) Message of the East Berlin People’s Police on the escape attempt of Ida Siekmann
The Wall of Shame; August 22, 1961, November 26, 2013
But Not the Last; August 22, 2015
La Última Oportunidad (The Last Chance) 
Remember Ida Siekmann and 22 August 1961 
Ida Siekmann's grave
Ida Siekmann at Kwidzynopedia 

1902 births
1961 deaths
People from West Prussia
Deaths at the Berlin Wall
Accidental deaths from falls
Accidental deaths in Germany
1960s in Berlin
People from Kwidzyn County
People from East Berlin
East German defectors